Janet Elizabeth Haworth is a Welsh Conservative politician who was a Member of the Welsh Assembly (AM) for the North Wales Region between 2015 and 2016.

Haworth ran a guest house from 2005 with her partner, Dennis Oliver.
She worked for Shell in Aberdeenshire until she retired to Llandudno in about 2003,
and became a town and county councillor.

Assembly Member
At the May 2011 election to the National Assembly for Wales, she was in third place on the Conservative list for the North Wales region. The Conservatives won two seats, which meant that Haworth was not elected. Antoinette Sandbach, who held one of the two Conservative list seats, was elected to the House of Commons at the 2015 general election. Sandbach announced her resignation from the National Assembly on 8 May 2015. As the next available candidate on the party list from 2011, Haworth succeeded her as an assembly member. She resigned as a Councillor in October 2015 after facing criticisms for her lack of attendance in council meetings following her appointment as an Assembly Member.

See also
 List of Welsh AMs/MSs with the shortest service

References

Year of birth missing (living people)
Living people
Conservative Party members of the Senedd
Female members of the Senedd
Wales AMs 2011–2016
People from Llandudno
People from Aberdeenshire
Councillors in Wales
Conservative Party (UK) councillors
Women councillors in Wales